The Ryoji Noyori Prize was established by the Society of Synthetic Organic Chemistry, Japan in 2002 to commemorate Ryōji Noyori winning the 101st Nobel Prize in Chemistry as well as the 60th anniversary of the Society of Synthetic Organic Chemistry. The prize is given "to recognize and encourage outstanding contributions to research in asymmetric synthetic chemistry defined in its broadest sense." The prize is sponsored by Takasago International Corporation.

Prizewinners
Source: Noyori Prize winners

2002 – Henri B. Kagan
2003 – Gilbert Stork
2004 – Dieter Seebach
2005 – Tsutomu Katsuki
2006 – David A. Evans
2007 – 
2008 – Andreas Pfaltz
2009 – Yoshio Okamoto
2010 – Eric N. Jacobsen
2011 – Hisashi Yamamoto
2012 – Masakatsu Shibasaki
2013 – Barry Trost
2014 – Dieter Enders
2015 – Larry E. Overman
2016 – 
2017 – David MacMillan
2018 – Yoshito Kishi
2019 – Scott E. Denmark
2020 – Tsuneo Imamoto
2021 – Erick M. Carreira

See also

 List of chemistry awards
 List of prizes named after people

References 

Chemistry awards
Japanese science and technology awards